National Council elections were held in the Czech part of Czechoslovakia on 23 and 24 May 1986.

Results

Seats by gender
145 Male
55 Female

External links
Mandate and Immunity Committee Message (Czech)
Election Results (Czech)

Czech
Legislative elections in Czechoslovakia
Elections to the Chamber of Deputies of the Czech Republic
Single-candidate elections
Czech